Diva is a 2010 Philippine television drama comedy musical series broadcast by GMA Network. Directed by Dominic Zapata, it stars Regine Velasquez in the title role. It premiered on March 1, 2010 on the network's Telebabad line up replacing Full House. It concluded on July 30, 2010 with a total of 107 episodes. It was replaced by Ilumina in its timeslot.

Cast and characters

Lead cast
 Regine Velasquez as Sampaguita "Sam" Fernandez / Melody

Supporting cast
 Rufa Mae Quinto as Lady Garcia Mendoza
 Mark Anthony Fernandez as Gary / Ate Kuh
 TJ Trinidad as Martin Valencia
 Glaiza de Castro as Tiffany Mendoza
 Mark Herras as Joey Pepe Smith Fernandez
 Jaya as Barang / Barbra
 Randy Santiago as George del Rosario
 Ynna Asistio as Vanessa
 Boboy Garovillo as Elvis Fernandez
 Gloria Diaz as Paula Abdul-Ah Fernandez

Recurring cast
 Enzo Pineda as Luke
 Gretchen Espina as Debbie Romasanta
 Michelle O'Bombshell as Elton
 Chariz Solomon as Did
 Caridad Sanchez as Aretha Abdul-Ah 
 Yassi Pressman as Olivia 
 Nadia Montenegro as Madonna
 Vangie Labalan as Glo
 Odette Khan as Eva
 Mang Enriquez as Barry Manilow
 Diego Llorico as Cams
 Carmen Soriano as Martin's mom
 Chinggoy Alonzo as Martin's dad
 Masculados
 Rochelle Pangilinan as Kelly Salvador / fake Sampaguita "Sam" Fernandez
 Sheena Halili as Lilet
 Mitch Valdez as Mother Superior
 Radha as Maria
 Pinky Amador as Leonora
 Eva Castillo as Theresa
 Scarlett as Bertha
 Tony Mabesa as a priest
 Elizabeth Ramsey as Turner
 Sef Cadayona as Marlon Legaspi
 Arci Muñoz as Natalie
 Dion Ignacio as Jay Z
 Alvin Aragon as Randy
 Sweet Ramos as young Sampaguita
 Nikki Bagaporo as teen Sampaguita and Stevie
 Sandy Talag as Charice
 JM Reyes as Mandy
 Renz Valerio as Lee
 Jason Abergido as Aaron
 Peejay as Andrew
 Vicki Belo as herself
 Bearwin Meily as Rey Toke
 Mike Hanopol
 Victor Wood
 Dexter Doria as Lady and Tiffany's mom
 Djanin Cruz as Marie
 German Moreno as Vernes
 Rachelle Ann Go as Demi
 Carlo Aquino as Joe
 Beverly Salviejo as Beth
 Ogie Alcasid as himself 
 Dingdong Dantes as himself
 Vaness del Moral as teen Eva
 Frencheska Farr as a host
 Gian Magdangal as a host
 Raymond Gutierrez as a talk show host

Ratings
According to AGB Nielsen Philippines' Mega Manila household television ratings, the pilot episode of Diva earned a 24.6% rating. While the final episode scored a 14.4% rating in Mega Manila People/Individual television ratings.

References

External links
 

2010 Philippine television series debuts
2010 Philippine television series endings
Filipino-language television shows
GMA Network drama series
Philippine musical television series
Television shows set in the Philippines